Ashtabula Towne Square, formerly Ashtabula Mall, is an enclosed shopping mall serving the city of Ashtabula, Ohio, United States. It has the capacity for 70 stores, as well as a food court, and a six-screen movie theater. The mall does not have an open anchor store.

The mall has six vacant anchors last occupied by Sears, Steve & Barry's, Super Kmart, JCPenney and two locations of Dillard's.

History
Ashtabula Towne Square opened in 1992 as Ashtabula Mall. The mall featured Dillard's, JCPenney, Kmart (later expanded into a Super Kmart), Phar-Mor, Carlisle's, and Sears as anchor stores. The Kmart and Phar-Mor stores were both prototypes, with the latter also being that chain's 300th store. While Sears and Phar-Mor opened in August of that year, the mall itself  did not open until the fall. Carlisle's closed in 1994 with the chain's demise and was later converted to a Dillard's Home Store.

Phar-Mor closed in the mid-late 1990s. Steve & Barry's replaced Phar-Mor in 2005. Also, Dillard's closed the Home Store to focus on fashion apparel but ended up also closing its main location in 2007.

The mall was purchased by Cabot Investment Properties in 2008 and renamed Ashtabula Towne Square. Since the mall's renaming, several more stores have closed, including Old Navy, Spencer's Gifts, Claire's, Fashion Bug, Lane Bryant, Payless ShoeSource, Wendy's, GameStop, Mr. Hero, and J.B. Robinson Jewelers. Ruby Tuesday also closed its Ashtabula Mall location in March 2008, followed by Steve & Barry's in October. Finish Line, Inc., King's Jewelers and Zales have also closed since early 2009, and Waldenbooks closed in early 2010. The mall was foreclosed on in 2011. Sears closed in 2012 and now University hospitals, and Kmart closed in 2016, which makes JCPenney and Dunham's Sports the last anchors to be occupied.

Ashtabula Towne Square and attached properties was sold in February 2020 by Sure Fire Group, LLC to Ashtabula Mall Realty Holding LLC (Kohan Retail Investment Group) for $10.2 million.

On June 4, 2020, JCPenney announced that it would close by around October 2020 as part of a plan to close 154 stores nationwide. After JCPenney closed, Dunham's Sports will be the one and only anchor store left, which closed in 2021.

References

External links
 Official website

Buildings and structures in Ashtabula County, Ohio
Shopping malls in Ohio
Shopping malls established in 1992
Kohan Retail Investment Group
Tourist attractions in Ashtabula County, Ohio
1992 establishments in Ohio